The 2001 Italian general election was held in Italy on 13 May 2001 to elect members of the Chamber of Deputies and the Senate of the Republic. The election was won by the centre-right coalition House of Freedoms led by Silvio Berlusconi, defeating Francesco Rutelli, former mayor of Rome, and leader of the centre-left coalition The Olive Tree, and rising back to power after Berlusconi's first victory in the 1994 Italian general election.

Electoral system 
The intricate electoral system, called scorporo, provided 75% of the seats on the Chamber of Deputies (the Lower House) as elected by first-past-the-post system, whereas the remaining 25% was assigned on proportional representation with a minimum threshold of 4%. The method used for the Senate was even more complicated: 75% of seats by uninominal method, and 25% by a special proportional method that assigned the remaining seats to minority parties. Formally, these were examples of additional member systems.

General election

Campaign 
For this election Berlusconi again ran as leader of the centre-right House of Freedoms, which included the Union of Christian and Centre Democrats, the Northern League, the National Alliance and other parties.

On the television interviews programme Porta a Porta, during the last days of the electoral campaign, Berlusconi created a powerful impression on the public by undertaking to sign a so-called Contratto con gli Italiani, an idea copied outright by his advisor Luigi Crespi from the Newt Gingrich's Contract with America introduced six weeks before the 1994 US Congressional election, which was widely considered to be a creative masterstroke in his 2001 campaign bid for prime ministership. In this solemn agreement, Berlusconi claimed his commitment on improving several aspects of the Italian economy and life. Firstly, he undertook to simplify the complex tax system by introducing just two tax rates (33% for those earning over 100,000 euros, and 23% for anyone earning less than that figure: anyone earning less than 11,000 euros a year would not be taxed); secondly, he promised to halve the unemployment rate; thirdly, he undertook to finance and develop a massive new public works programme. Fourthly, he promised to raise the minimum monthly pension rate to 516 euros; and fifthly, he would suppress the crime wave by introducing police officers to patrol all local zones and areas in Italy's major cities. Berlusconi undertook to refrain from putting himself up for re-election in 2006 if he failed to honour at least four of these five promises.

Main coalitions and parties

Coalitions' leaders

Results

Chamber of Deputies

Overall results

Proportional and FPTP results 
In 2001 the proportional list exhausted before all the deputies – which the winning party was entitled to – were declared elected.

FPTP and proportional results by constituency

Senate of the Republic

Overall results

FPTP and proportional results by constituency

Maps

Leaders' races

References

External links 
Repubblica.it: About 2001 Election (in Italian)
Corriere della Sera: About 2001 Election (in Italian)
CNN.com: About 2001 Election
Minister of Internal Affairs of Italy: 2001 Election Results, Chamber of Deputies (in Italian)
Minister of Internal Affairs of Italy: 2001 Election Results, Senate of the Republic (in Italian)

2001
General election
May 2001 events in Europe